Sherwin Siy (born July 29, 1980, in Houston, Texas – July 7, 2021) was an American attorney and activist who served as the lead public policy manager at the Wikimedia Foundation. He was an adjunct lecturer at GW Law and an adjunct instructor at American University School of Communications. He previously served as vice-president of legal affairs at the Washington, D.C.-based digital rights group Public Knowledge and as a special counsel for the Federal Communications Commission. He died of natural causes in North Carolina on July 7, 2021.

Biography 
Sherwin graduated with a Bachelor of Arts from Stanford University, and received a Juris Doctor from University of California, Berkeley.

External links 
 Memorial Service for Sherwin.

References 

2021 deaths
Wikimedia Foundation staff members
Stanford University alumni
University of California, Berkeley alumni
1980 births